Luanne Rice is an American novelist. Her 36 novels have been translated into 26 languages. She often writes about nature and the sea, and many of her novels deal with love and family. She is the author of The Lemon Orchard, Little Night, The Silver Boat and Beach Girls.

Biography
Born in New Britain, Connecticut, Rice's first published poem appeared in the Hartford Courant when she was eleven, and her first short story was published in American Girl when she was fifteen. Her debut novel, Angels All Over Town, was published in 1985.

In 2002, Connecticut College awarded Rice an honorary degree and invited her to donate her papers to the college's Special Collections Library. She has also received an honorary doctorate of humane letters from St. Joseph College in West Hartford, Conn. In June 2014, she received the 2014 Connecticut Governor’s Arts Award in the Literary Arts category for excellence and lifetime achievement as a literary artist.

Rice is an avid environmentalist and advocate for families affected by domestic violence.

Several of Rice's novels have been adapted for television, including Crazy in Love for TNT, Blue Moon for CBS, Follow the Stars Home and Silver Bells for the Hallmark Hall of Fame, and Beach Girls for a summer 2005 mini-series on Lifetime.

Rice contributed a monologue to Motherhood Out Loud, a play that premiered at Hartford Stage Company and was performed Off-Broadway and at the Geffen Playhouse in Los Angeles.

Rice divides her time between New York City, Old Lyme, Connecticut, and Southern California.

Bibliography 
 1985: Angels All Over Town
 1988: Crazy in Love
 1990: Stone Heart
 1991: Secrets of Paris
 1993: Blue Moon
 1995: Home Fires
 1999: Cloud Nine
 2000: Follow the Stars Home
 2001: Dream Country; Firefly Beach; Summer Light
 2002: Safe Harbor; True Blue
 2003: The Perfect Summer; The Secret Hour
 2004: Beach Girls; Dance With Me; Silver Bells
 2005: Lily Malone 1.Summer's Child; 2.Summer of Roses
 2006: Sandcastles
 2007: The Edge of Winter
 2007: What Matters Most
 2008: Light of the Moon; Last Kiss; The Letters, co-written with Joseph Monninger
 2009: The Geometry of Sisters
 2010: The Deep Blue Sea for Beginners
 2011: The Silver Boat
 2012: Little Night (
 2013: The Lemon Orchard
 2013: The Night Before (ASIN: B00KB5P1B) DIGITAL, 24 PGS.
 2016: The Secret Language of Sisters
2017: The Beautiful Lost
2019: Pretend She's Here
2020: Last Day
2021: The Shadow Box

References

External links 
 
 
 Rice's blog
 Interview with Rice
 Publishers Weekly
 Good Morning America

1955 births
Living people
20th-century American novelists
21st-century American novelists
American women novelists
Writers from New Britain, Connecticut
Novelists from Connecticut
Writers from New York City
20th-century American women writers
21st-century American women writers
Novelists from New York (state)
Connecticut College alumni